Your Uncle Dudley is a 1935 American comedy film directed by Eugene Forde and written by Allen Birkin, Joseph Hoffman and Dore Schary. The film stars Edward Everett Horton, Lois Wilson, John McGuire, Rosina Lawrence, Alan Dinehart and Marjorie Gateson. The film was released on December 13, 1935, by 20th Century Fox.

Plot

Cast 
Edward Everett Horton as Dudley Dixon
Lois Wilson as Christine Saunders
John McGuire as Robert Kirby
Rosina Lawrence as Ethel Church
Alan Dinehart as Charlie Post
Marjorie Gateson as Mabel Dixon
William "Billy" Benedict as Cyril Church
Florence Roberts as Janet Dixon
Jane Barnes as Marjorie Baxter

References

External links 
 

1935 films
1930s English-language films
American comedy films
1935 comedy films
20th Century Fox films
Films directed by Eugene Forde
American black-and-white films
1930s American films